Combe is a small village in the county of Devon, England. It lies on the River Mardle about 2 miles north west of the town of Buckfastleigh.

References

Villages in Devon